The McDonnell XHJH Whirlaway, aka McDonnell Model 65, was a 1940s American experimental transverse-rotor helicopter designed and built by McDonnell Aircraft Corporation for the United States Navy and was the largest helicopter at the time, as well as the first successful twin-engined twin-rotor helicopter in the world.

Design and development
In 1944, the United States Navy issued a requirement for a large rescue helicopter with capacity for ten occupants. The design was originally designated XHJD-1; shortly after flying it was re-designated the XHJH-1. It was derived from the single-engined, twin rotor Platt-LePage XR-1. James McDonnell had invested in that company in 1942 and some of his engineers had been working there, gaining experience of helicopter design and production techniques. McDonnell took control of the company in June 1944. The XHJH-1 first flew two months later. It had twin side-by-side  rotors at the end of pylon wings which turned in opposite directions. Each rotor was powered by a  Pratt & Whitney R-985-AN-14B Wasp Junior engine.

Variants
XHJD-1
Original United States Navy designation.
XHJH-1
Designation changed before first flight.

Aircraft on display
The sole XHJH-1 is held by the National Air and Space Museum.

Specifications

See also

References

External links

 McDonnell XHJD-1 Whirlaway in NASM Collection

1940s United States military utility aircraft
HJ1H Whirlaway
Aircraft first flown in 1946
1940s United States helicopters
Transverse rotor helicopters
Twin-engined piston helicopters